Moon Deck (1950–1974) was an influential Quarter Horse sire and racehorse.

Life

Moon Deck was a brown stallion foaled on March 28, 1950 at J. B. Ferguson's Wharton, Texas ranch, the son of Top Deck (TB) and a Quarter Horse race mare named Moonlight Night. Moonlight Night was bred in Louisiana, a daughter of Peace Pipe (TB) and out of a descendant of Dewey (TB) and Doc Horn (TB) named Mae.

Racing career 
Moon Deck started 62 times in six years. He won 11 of his races, placed second 11 times, and was third six times. He earned 75 racing points with the American Quarter Horse Association (or AQHA), qualifying for the Superior Race Horse Award. His highest speed rating was AAA. After six years of racing, Moon Deck was sold to James V. A. Carter, for $9000.

Breeding record 
During his career at stud, he sired such horses as Jet Deck, Top Moon, Solar Fancy, Cue Deck, Caprideck, and Jet Too.

Death and honors 
Moon Deck died of a twisted intestine in the ownership of Don Keith and J. Ralph Bell on January 13, 1974.

Moon Deck was inducted into the AQHA Hall of Fame in 1996.

Pedigree

Notes

References

 All Breed Pedigree Database Pedigree of Moon Deck retrieved on June 23, 2007
 AQHA Hall of Fame accessed on September 1, 2017

External links
 Moon Deck at Quarter Horse Directory
 Moon Deck at Quarter Horse Legends

American Quarter Horse racehorses
American Quarter Horse sires
1950 racehorse births
1974 racehorse deaths
AQHA Hall of Fame (horses)